SS Suportco was a Design 1023 cargo ship built for the United States Shipping Board immediately after World War I.

History
She was laid down at yard number 123 at the Newark, New Jersey shipyard of the Submarine Boat Corporation (SBC), one of 132 Design 1023 cargo ships built for the United States Shipping Board (there were 154 ships of the class built in total). She was launched on 22 May 1920, completed in July 1920, and named Suportco after her builder and the Port of Newark  (SUbmarine PORT COrporation). In 1931, she was one of 22 Design 1023 ships purchased by the Portland California Steamship Company. In 1939, she was broken up by the Boston I & M Company.

References

Bibliography

External links
 EFC Design 1023: Illustrations

1920 ships
Merchant ships of the United States
Ships built by the Submarine Boat Company
Design 1023 ships